Wheelchair rugby at the 2019 Parapan American Games in Lima, Peru will start from 23 to 27 August. The winner of the competition will automatically qualify to the 2020 Summer Paralympics.

Medalists

Team roster

Results
Round robin

Semi finals

5/6th classification match

Bronze medal match

Gold medal match

See also
Rugby sevens at the 2019 Pan American Games
Wheelchair rugby at the 2020 Summer Paralympics

References

External links
 Wheelchair Rugby

2019 Parapan American Games
2019 in rugby union
Wheelchair rugby at the Parapan American Games